Abdelhak Benchikha (born 22 November 1963) is an Algerian football manager and the current head coach of USM Alger.

Personal
Benchikha was born on 22 November 1963 in the Soustara neighborhood of Algiers.

His family is originally from the village of Sidi Abderrahmane in the commune of Timezrit, Boumerdès Province.

Managerial career
Benchikha began his managerial career coach with CR Belouizdad, where he helped win the league title two years in a row, in 2000 and 2001. He then briefly coached MC Alger and the Algerian Under-23 national team before returning to CR Belouizdad in the later part of the 2004-2005 season. Benchikha then moved to Qatar and joined Umm-Salal Sports Club, which was playing in the second division. In his only season with the club, he helped it gain promotion to the top flight. The following season, he joined the Tunisian side ES Zarzis.

Club Africain
On 13 June 2007 Benchikha signed a one-year contract with Tunisian side Club Africain. In his first season with the club, he led them to the league title for the first time in 12 years, beating out Etoile du Sahel by just 2 points in the final standings. Just a few months later, he followed that up with a triumph in the 2008 North African Cup of Champions beating Moroccan club FAR Rabat in the final. In March 2009, the club offered him an extension but Benchikha chose to leave the club.

Algeria A'
On 10 June 2009 Benchikha was appointed as coach of the Algeria A' national football team and the Algerian Under-23 national team. He qualified the A' national team to the 2011 African Nations Championship, after beating Libya 2-2 on the away goals rule.

Algeria National Team
On 13 September 2010 Benchikha was appointed as coach of the Algerian national team on a permanent basis, following the resignation Rabah Saâdane. On 5 June 2011 a day after losing 4-0 in a 2012 Africa Cup of Nations qualifier against Morocco, Benchikha resigned from his position.

On 5 October 2011 Benchikha resigned from his position as manager of MC Alger.

On 17 December 2011 Benchikha signed an 18-month contract with Tunisian Ligue Professionnelle 1 side Club Africain, returning to the club which he led to the 2008 league title. However, on 20 April 2012 a mutual agreement was reached by the club and Benchikha to terminate his contract.

Honours
 Won the Algerian Ligue Professionnelle 1 twice with CR Belouizdad in 2000 and 2001 
 Won the Tunisian Ligue Professionnelle 1 once with Club Africain in 2008
 Won the North African Cup of Champions once with Club Africain in 2008
 Won the Qatar 2nd Division once with Umm-Salal SC in 2006
Coupe du Trône: 
Winners (1): 2013

References

External links
Abdelhak Benchikha at Footballdatabase

1963 births
Living people
Kabyle people
People from Casbah
Algerian footballers
ES Zarzis players
MC Alger players
JS El Biar players
JS Bordj Ménaïel players
Association football midfielders
Algerian expatriate footballers
Expatriate footballers in Tunisia

Algerian football managers
MC Alger managers
Algeria under-23 international managers
CR Belouizdad managers
Umm Salal SC managers
ES Zarzis managers
Club Africain football managers
Algeria national football team managers
Raja CA managers
Al-Ittihad Kalba SC managers
Ittihad Tanger managers
Moghreb Tétouan managers
ES Sétif managers
Al-Ittihad Tripoli managers

Algerian expatriate football managers
Expatriate football managers in Qatar
Algerian expatriate sportspeople in Qatar
Expatriate football managers in Tunisia
Algerian expatriate sportspeople in Tunisia
Expatriate football managers in the United Arab Emirates
Algerian expatriate sportspeople in the United Arab Emirates
Expatriate football managers in Morocco
Algerian expatriate sportspeople in Morocco
Expatriate football managers in Libya
Algerian expatriate sportspeople in Libya
21st-century Algerian people
Botola managers